Song of the Clouds (French: Sérénade aux nuages) is a 1946 French comedy film directed by André Cayatte and starring Tino Rossi, Jacqueline Gauthier and Jacques Louvigny.

It was shot at the Marseille Studios of Marcel Pagnol in Southern France. The film's sets were designed by the art directors Auguste Capelier and Georges Wakhévitch. It was one of the most popular movies in France in 1945 with admissions of 3,498,968.

Cast
 Tino Rossi as Sylvio
 Jacqueline Gauthier as Gracieuse
 Jacques Louvigny as L'imprésario de Sylvio 
 Maximilienne as Mademoiselle Anaïs
 Noël Roquevert as Le comte Fabrice
 Pierre Larquey as Le jardinier du château
 Clairette Oddera as La postière du village
 Maurice Teynac 
 Camille Guérini
 Guy Decomble	
 Germaine Gerlata
 Albert Duvaleix
 Luce Fabiole

References

Bibliography
 Crisp, Colin. French Cinema—A Critical Filmography: Volume 2, 1940–1958. Indiana University Press, 2015.

External links
Song of the Clouds at IMDb

1946 films
French black-and-white films
French comedy films
1946 comedy films
Films directed by André Cayatte
1940s French-language films
1940s French films